RocKwiz is an Australian television quiz show series, focused on rock music, and broadcast on SBS One. It premiered in 2005. The final episode aired on 25 June 2016. In February 2019, SBS Channel Manager Ben Nguyen announced that the show is not returning to SBS.

In October 2022, it was announced the series will be revived by Foxtel and will air on Fox8 in 2023 with eight 30 minute long episodes.

With the possible exceptions of episodes 49, 105, 106 and 107, the following episode numbering is as per SBS OnDemand information.

Season 1

Season 2

Season 3

Season 4

Season 5

RocKwiz 2007 Christmas special
On 22 December 2007, a special RocKwiz show (RocKwiz Christmas Special) was broadcast featuring the RocKwiz band (James Black, Peter Luscombe, Mark Ferrie) along with the Wolfgramm Sisters on backing vocals, Ashley Naylor on guitar and following guest performers:
All Alone on Christmas / Please Come Home on Christmas / Christmas Ain't Christmas Without The One You Love / Run Run Rudolf / All I Want For Christmas - The Wolfgramm Sisters, Jade MacRae, Joe Camilleri, Ashley Naylor and the RocKwiz Orkestra
Fairytale of New York - Clare Bowditch, Tex Perkins, Joe Camilleri, Ashley Naylor and the RocKwiz Orkestra
Christmas Wrapping - Chelsea Wheatley, The Wolfgramm Sisters, Ashley Naylor and the RocKwiz Orkestra
River - Angie Hart, Tim Freedman, Ashley Naylor and the RocKwiz Orkestra
Maybe This Christmas - Tim Freedman, Ashley Naylor and the RocKwiz Orkestra
How To Make Gravy - Paul Kelly, Dan Kelly, Ashley Naylor and the RocKwiz Orkestra
Merry Christmas Everybody - Liam Finn, Jade MacRae, Tex Perkins, Clare Bowditch, Chelsea Wheatley, Angie Hart, Tim Freedman, Paul Kelly, The Wolfgramm Sisters, Brian Nankervis, Julia Zemiro, Ashley Naylor and the RocKwiz Orkestra

Season 6

RocKwiz Salutes the Bowl
On 7 March 2009, a special 90-minute RocKwiz show (RocKwiz Salutes the Bowl) was broadcast as the sixth season's finale. The episode was filmed on 13 February 2009 at the Sidney Myer Music Bowl in front of a crowd of about 11,000 people (as part of the Bowl's 50th birthday celebrations). Whilst the show maintained a similar quiz format to a regular episode, it featured many more guest stars giving performances before, between, and after the usual rounds. For the occasion, the regular RockWiz band was expanded with the Wolfgramm Sisters on backing vocals, Ashley Naylor on guitar, and a horn section featuring Paul Williamson.

Nic Cester & Ashley Naylor – Venus & Mars / Rock Show / Maybe I'm Amazed
Kram – Most People I Know (Think That I'm Crazy)
Rebecca Barnard & Billy Miller – World of Our Own
Adalita – Rock 'N' Roll Ain't Noise Pollution
Kutcha Edwards, Ron Murray & Joshua Bond – Treaty
Denis Walter – Crunchy Granola Suite
Jeff Duff – Dancing Queen
Paul Kelly – Cinnamon Girl
Mick Fettes – 12Lb Toothbrush
Stephen Cummings & Andrew Pendlebury – Who Listens to the Radio?
Ella Hooper & Bob Starkie – Living in the Seventies
Ross Wilson & Ross Hannaford – Bom Bom
Ross Wilson & Ross Hannaford – Hi Honey Ho
Bella Hunter – April Sun in Cuba
Dave Faulkner & Lisa Miller – Like A Rolling Stone
Patience Hodgson, Glenn Richards & Paul Kelly – Leaps And Bounds
Judith Durham – The Carnival Is Over

Season 7

Note: it is not certain that episodes 105, 106 and 107 are officially part of season seven.

RocKwiz 2009 Christmas special
The 2009 RocKwiz Christmas special was broadcast on 19 December 2009. The 90-minute special was filmed at the Palais Theatre in St. Kilda, Melbourne. The show featured a regular quiz format, except that there were multiple contestants and guest performers. The regular RocKwiz Orkestra was augmented by Ashley Naylor on guitar and the Wolfgramm sisters (Eliza, Kelly, and Talei) on vocals. The guest performers were (in order of performance):
Tex Perkins and Tim Rogers
Paris Wells
Paul Gray and Abby Dobson
Adalita Srsen
Bill Chambers and Kasey Chambers
Holiday Sidewinder and Glenn Richards
Toby Martin and Sarah Kelly
Sally Seltmann and Dan Kelly
Tex Perkins and Paris Wells
Vika Bull and John Paul Young
Tim Rogers
Joe Camilleri

Season 8

Season 9

RocKwiz 2011 Christmas special
The 2011 RocKwiz Christmas special was broadcast on 24 December 2011. The 82-minute special was filmed at the Palais Theatre in St Kilda, Melbourne. The show featured three quiz segments, the first involving guest performers and the second and third (and main quizzes) involving four audience members with team leaders Rebecca Barnard and Lanie Lane, and then Josh Pike and Jon English. The guest performers were (in order of performance):
"Merry Christmas Everybody" – sung by The Nymphs (Kelly Day, Clare Hendry, Jane Hendry)
"Sleigh Ride" – sung by Julia Zemiro
"Soul Christmas" – sung by Shellie Morris and Ross Wilson
"All I Want For Christmas Is You" – sung by Henry Wagons
"Santa Baby" – sung by Patience Hodgson
"Someday at Christmas" – sung by Josh Pyke
"Rocket ship Santa" – sung by Rebecca Barnard
"A Christmas Card from Dougal McAndrew" – read by Brian Nankervis
"Christmas Card from a Hooker in Minneapolis" – sung by Lanie Lane
"Happy Xmas (War Is Over)" and "Jesus Christ, Superstar" – sung by Jon English
"Christmas Must Be Tonight" – sung by Paul Kelly
"I Don't Want to Fight Tonight" – sung by Patience Hodgson and Ross Wilson
"Love Will Roll the Clouds Away" – sung by everyone (including the audience)

Season 10

Season 11

RocKwiz Bluesfest special
 Vika & Linda Bull
 Alan Stone
 Ruthie Foster
 Steve Kilbey
 Tex Perkins
 Trombone Shorty
 Nkechi Anele & Saskwatch Horns
 Kylie Auldist & Lance Fergusson
 Emily Lubitz
 Dan Sultan
 Russell Morris

Season 12

RocKwiz Vanda and Young special
 Nic McKenzie
 Hailey Cramer
 The Basics
 Ashley Naylor
 Gossling
 Steve Kilbey
 Doc Neeson
 Issabella Manfredi
 Mark Gable
 Dave Larkin

RocKwiz at Bluesfest 2014 special
 Vika & Linda Bull
 Adalita Srsen
 Robert Susz
 Steve Earle
 Grace Potter
 Continental Robert
 Garland Jeffreys

Season 13 - RocKwiz Salutes The Decades

Season 14 - RocKwiz Salutes The Legends

Vika and Linda provide lead and backing vocals on all episodes.

Season 15 - Foxtel Series 1

DVD releases
RocKwiz Series 1 – Contains episodes 1–12
RocKwiz Series 2 – Contains episodes 13–29
RocKwiz Series 3 – Contains episodes 31–38
RocKwiz Series 4 – Contains episodes 39–48, 49 (End of Year Special) and 50 (Live at the Forum)
RocKwiz Salutes The Bowl
RocKwiz 2010 National Tour

References
NOTE:  SBS on demand cycles their videos.  Not all videos will be available on their site at any given time, but may become available again at a future date.

External links

 at IMDb.com

Lists of Australian non-fiction television series episodes